Omega Lupi, Latinised from ω Lupi, is a double star in the southern constellation of Lupus. It is visible to the naked eye with an apparent visual magnitude of 4.33, showing up as a red-hued star just to the south of Gamma Lupi. Based upon an annual parallax shift of 8.97 mas as seen from Earth, it is located around 360 light-years from the Sun.

As of 2007, the components of this system had an angular separation of 11.4 arcseconds along a position angle of 29°, and are most likely gravitationally bound as a wide binary star system. The primary component is a magnitude 4.48 evolved giant star with a stellar classification of K4.5 III. At the estimated distance of Omega Lupi, this yields a physical size of about 40 times the radius of the Sun. The companion is a magnitude 11.0 star.

References

K-type giants
Lupus (constellation)
Lupi, Omega
CD-42 10601
139127
076552
5797
Double stars